Calliotropis bicarinata is a species of sea snail, a marine gastropod mollusk in the family Eucyclidae.

Description
The shell can grow to be 15 mm.

Distribution
This marine species occurs off Indonesia and the Philippines.

References

 Vilvens C. (2007) New records and new species of Calliotropis from Indo-Pacific. Novapex 8 (Hors Série 5): 1–72.

bicarinata
Gastropods described in 1908